A woodland is, in the broad sense, land covered with trees, or in a narrow sense, synonymous with wood (or in the U.S., the plurale tantum woods), a low-density forest forming open habitats with plenty of sunlight and limited shade (see differences between British, American, and Australian English explained below). Some savannas may also be woodlands, such as savanna woodland, where trees and shrubs form a light canopy.

Woodlands may support an understory of shrubs and herbaceous plants including grasses. Woodland may form a transition to shrubland under drier conditions or during early stages of primary or secondary succession.  Higher-density areas of trees with a largely closed canopy that provides extensive and nearly continuous shade are often referred to as forests. 

Extensive efforts by conservationist groups have been made to preserve woodlands from urbanization and agriculture. For example, the woodlands of Northwest Indiana have been preserved as part of the Indiana Dunes.

Definitions

United Kingdom 
Woodland is used in British woodland management to mean tree-covered areas which arose naturally and which are then managed, while forest is usually used in the British Isles to describe plantations, usually more extensive, or hunting Forests, which are a land use with a legal definition and may not be wooded at all.  The term ancient woodland is used in British nature conservation to refer to any wooded land that has existed since 1600, and often (though not always) for thousands of years, since the last Ice Age (equivalent to the American term old-growth forest).

North America
Woodlot is a closely related term in American forest management, which refers to a stand of trees generally used for firewood. While woodlots often technically have closed canopies, they are so small that light penetration from the edge makes them ecologically closer to woodland than forest.

Australia
In Australia, a woodland is defined as an area with sparse (10–30%) cover of trees, and an open woodland has very sparse (<10%) cover. This contrasts with forests, which have greater than 30% cover by trees.

Woodland ecoregions

Tropical and subtropical grasslands, savannas, and shrublands

 Afrotropical realm
 Angolan miombo woodlands (Angola)
 Angolan mopane woodlands (Angola, Namibia)
 Central Zambezian miombo woodlands (Angola, Burundi, Democratic Republic of the Congo, Malawi, Tanzania, Zambia)
 Eastern miombo woodlands (Mozambique, Tanzania)
 Kalahari Acacia-Baikiaea woodlands (Botswana, Namibia, South Africa, Zimbabwe)
 Zambezian and mopane woodlands (Botswana, Eswatini, Malawi, Mozambique, Namibia, South Africa, Zambia, Zimbabwe)
 Zambezian Baikiaea woodlands (Angola, Botswana, Namibia, Zambia, Zimbabwe)
 Nearctic realm
 Madrean pine–oak woodlands (Mexico)
 Neotropical realm
 Cerrado woodlands and savannas (Bolivia, Brazil, Paraguay)

Temperate grasslands, savannas, and shrublands

 Afrotropical realm
 Al Hajar montane woodlands (Oman)
 Australasian realm
 Central Hunter Valley eucalypt forest and woodland (Australia)
 Cumberland Plain Woodland (Australia)
 Gippsland Plains Grassy Woodland (Australia)
 Grey Box Grassy Woodlands (Australia)
 Lowland Grassy Woodland (Australia)
 New England Peppermint Grassy Woodland (Australia)
 Nearctic realm
 Central forest–grasslands transition (United States)
 Upper Midwest forest–savanna transition (United States)
 Palearctic realm
 Gissaro-Alai open woodlands (Kyrgyzstan, Tajikistan, Uzbekistan)

Montane grasslands and shrublands

 Afrotropical realm
 Angolan Scarp savanna and woodlands (Angola)
 Drakensberg alti-montane grasslands and woodlands (Lesotho, South Africa)
 Drakensberg montane grasslands, woodlands and forests (Eswatini, Lesotho, South Africa)
 East African montane moorlands (Kenya, Sudan, Tanzania, Uganda)
 Ethiopian montane grasslands and woodlands (Ethiopia)
 Nearctic realm
 Pinyon–juniper woodland (United States)
 Palearctic realm
 Kopet Dag woodlands and forest steppe (Iran, Turkmenistan)

Mediterranean forests, woodlands, and scrub

 Australasian realm
 Banksia Woodlands of the Swan Coastal Plain (Australia)
 Coolgardie woodlands (Australia)
 Mount Lofty woodlands (Australia)
 Murray-Darling woodlands and mallee (Australia)
 Naracoorte woodlands (Australia)
 Southwest Australia woodlands (Australia)
 Swan Coastal Plain Shrublands and Woodlands (Australia)
 Nearctic realm
 California chaparral and woodlands (United States)
 California montane chaparral and woodlands (United States)
 California interior chaparral and woodlands (United States)

 Palearctic realm
 Canary Islands dry woodlands and forests (Spain)
 Eastern Mediterranean conifer–sclerophyllous–broadleaf forests (Turkey, Syria, Israel, Jordan, Iraq, Lebanon)
 Mediterranean acacia-argania dry woodlands and succulent thickets (Morocco, Canary Islands)
 Mediterranean dry woodlands and steppe (Algeria, Egypt, Libya, Morocco, Tunisia)
 Mediterranean woodlands and forests (Algeria, Morocco, Tunisia)
 Southeastern Iberian shrubs and woodlands (Spain)

Deserts and xeric shrublands

 Afrotropical realm
 East Saharan montane xeric woodlands (Chad, Sudan)
 Madagascar succulent woodlands (Madagascar)
 Somali montane xeric woodlands (Somalia)
 Southwestern Arabian montane woodlands (Saudi Arabia, Yemen)
 Palearctic realm
 Baluchistan xeric woodlands (Afghanistan, Pakistan)
 Central Afghan Mountains xeric woodlands (Afghanistan)
 Central Asian riparian woodlands (Kazakhstan)
 North Saharan steppe and woodlands (Algeria, Egypt, Libya, Morocco, Tunisia, Western Sahara)
 Paropamisus xeric woodlands (Afghanistan)
 South Saharan steppe and woodlands (Algeria, Chad, Mali, Mauritania, Niger, Sudan)
 Tibesti-Jebel Uweinat montane xeric woodlands (Chad, Egypt, Libya, Sudan)
 West Saharan montane xeric woodlands (Algeria, Mali, Mauritania, Niger)

See also

References

External links
 
 The UK Woodland Trust
 Woodland Bond

Forests
Habitats